The Bo Government Secondary School commonly known as Bo School is a secondary school located on a  property in the center of Bo, the second largest city in Sierra Leone. The school was founded in 1906 at the behest of the British colonial governor, Leslie Probyn, to educate the sons of Paramount Chiefs or nominees of Paramount Chiefs. The school later evolved to become a public school that is open to boys from all backgrounds.
 
Bo school is a boys-only boarding school. The pupils live in the four dormitory buildings (called Towns) on the school's campus. The four dormitories are called Manchester, London, Liverpool, and Paris respectively—the first three are named after famous cities in England, and the last is named after capital of France.

Notable pupils
 Banja Tejan-Sie, Sierra Leonean politician and one of the founding members of the Sierra Leone People's Party (SLPP)
 Sorie Ibrahim Koroma, Vice President of Sierra Leone from 1971 to 1986
Julius Maada Bio, President of Sierra Leone since 2018
 Albert Joe Demby, Vice President of Sierra Leone from 1996 to 2002
 John Amadu Bangura, Chief of the Defence Staff of the Sierra Leone Armed Forces from 1968 to 1970.
 Salia Jusu-Sheriff, Vice President of Sierra Leone from 1987 to 1991
 Sheku Fomba Kutubu, Chief Justice of Sierra Leone from 1987 to 1993
 Abdulai Timbo, Chief Justice of Sierra Leone from 2002 to 2004
 William Siaffa, Inspector General of the Sierra Leone Police from 1994 to 1996.
 Hassan Conteh, Chief of Defence Staff of the Republic of Sierra Leone Armed Forces from 1996 to 1997.
 Victor Bockarie Foh, Vice President of Sierra Leone from 2005 to 2018.
 Kanja Sesay, politician
 Tamba Lamina, diplomat and politician
 Ibrahim Inspector Bah, Sierra Leonean football star and former captain of Leone Stars
 Amadu Wurie, Sierra Leonean educationist and politician
 Julius Wobay, footballer
 Aluspah Brewah, footballer
 Paul Kpaka, footballer

References

 Arthur Abraham. Mende Government and Politics under Colonial Rule: A Historical Study of Political Change in Sierra Leone, 1890–1937. Freetown: Sierra Leone University Press; distributed by Oxford University Press, New York. 1978. Pp. xiv, 330. $22.00. (1980). The American Historical Review. https://doi.org/10.1086/ahr/85.1.184-a
 Corby, R. A. (1974). AfricaBib | Early years at Bo school. AfricaBib. Retrieved January 10, 2022, from https://africabib.org/rec.php?RID=185284345&DB=d
 Corby, R. A. (1981). Bo School and Its Graduates in Colonial Sierra Leone. Canadian Journal of African Studies, 15(2), 323. https://doi.org/10.2307/484417
 Corby, R. A. (1990). Educating Africans for inferiority under British rule: Bo School in Sierra Leone. Comparative Education Review, 34(3), 314–349. https://doi.org/10.1086/446950
 Corby, R. A., & Abraham, A. (1980). Mende Government and Politics under Colonial Rule. A Historical Study of Political Change in Sierra Leone 1890–1937. ASA Review of Books, 6, 50. https://doi.org/10.2307/532616
 Little, K. (1955). Structural Change in the Sierra Leone Protectorate. Africa, 25(3), 217–234. https://doi.org/10.2307/1157103
 Sierra Leone. (2014). Google Books. Retrieved January 10, 2022, from https://books.google.nl/books?hl=en&lr=&id=K0lRBAAAQBAJ&oi=fnd&pg=PP1&dq=bo+school+sierra+leone&ots=BAfDyKD5A6&sig=fO_4YlUS_CjaA-wFg8sFMMopWdU&redir_esc=y#v=onepage&q=bo%20school%20sierra%20leone&f=false
 Wurie, A. (1974). AfricaBib | A history of Bo school. AfricaBib. Retrieved January 10, 2022, from https://www.africabib.org/rec.php?RID=185284329

Buildings and structures in Bo, Sierra Leone
Secondary schools in Sierra Leone
1906 establishments in Sierra Leone
Educational institutions established in 1906
Boys' schools in Sierra Leone